The University of Jena, officially the Friedrich Schiller University Jena (abbreviated FSU, shortened form Uni Jena), is a public research university located in Jena, Thuringia, Germany.

The university was established in 1558 and is counted among the ten oldest universities in Germany. It is affiliated with six Nobel Prize winners, most recently in 2000 when Jena graduate Herbert Kroemer won the Nobel Prize for physics. In the 2023 Times Higher Education World University Rankings, the university was awarded 189th place in the world. It was renamed after the poet Friedrich Schiller who was teaching as professor of philosophy when Jena attracted some of the most influential minds at the turn of the 19th century. With Karl Leonhard Reinhold, Johann Gottlieb Fichte, G. W. F. Hegel, F. W. J. Schelling and Friedrich Schlegel on its teaching staff, the university was at the centre of the emergence of German idealism and early Romanticism.

, the university has around 19,000 students enrolled and 375 professors. Its current president, Walter Rosenthal, has held the role since 2014.

History

Early history
Elector John Frederick of Saxony first thought of a plan to establish a university at Jena upon Saale in 1547 while he was being held captive by emperor Charles V. The plan was put into motion by his three sons and, after having obtained a charter from the Emperor Ferdinand I, the university was established on 2 February 1558. The university, jointly maintained by the Saxon Duchies who derived from partitioning of John Frederick's duchy, was thus named Ducal Pan-Saxon University or Salana (after the river Saale).

Prior to the 20th century, university enrollment peaked in the 18th century. The university's reputation peaked under the auspices of Duke Charles Augustus, Goethe's patron (1787–1806), when Gottlieb Fichte, G. W. F. Hegel, Friedrich Schelling, Friedrich von Schlegel and Friedrich Schiller were on its teaching staff.

Founded as a home for the new religious opinions of the sixteenth century, it has since been one of the most politically radical universities in Germany. Jena was noted among other German universities at the time for allowing students to duel and to have a passion for Freiheit, which were popularly regarded as the necessary characteristics of German student life. The University of Jena has preserved a historical detention room or Karzer with famous caricatures by Swiss painter Martin Disteli.

In the latter 19th century, the department of zoology taught evolutionary theory, with Carl Gegenbaur, Ernst Haeckel and others publishing detailed theories at the time of Darwin's "Origin of Species" (1858). The later fame of Ernst Haeckel eclipsed Darwin in some European countries, as the term "Haeckelism" was more common than Darwinism. 

In 1905, Jena had 1,100 students enrolled and its teaching staff (including Privatdozenten) numbered 112. Amongst its numerous auxiliaries then were the library, with 200,000 volumes; the observatory; the meteorological institute; the botanical garden; the seminaries of theology, philology, and education; and the well-equipped clinical, anatomical, and physical institutes.

After the end of the Saxon duchies in 1918, and their merger with further principalities into the Free State of Thuringia in 1920, the university was renamed as the Thuringian State University (Thüringische Landesuniversität) in 1921. In 1934 the university was renamed again, receiving its present name of Friedrich Schiller University. During the 20th century, the cooperation between Zeiss corporation and the university brought new prosperity and attention to Jena, resulting in a dramatic increase in funding and enrollment.

Nazi period

During the Third Reich, staunch Nazis moved into leading positions at the university. The racial researcher and SS-Hauptscharführer Karl Astel was appointed professor in 1933, bypassing traditional qualifications and process; he later became rector of the university in 1939. Also in 1933, many professors had to leave the university as a consequence of the Law for the Restoration of the Professional Civil Service. Student fraternities – in particular the Burschenschaften – were dissolved and incorporated into the Nazi student federation. The Nazi student federation enjoyed before the transfer of power and won great support among the student body elections in January 1933, achieving 49.3% of the vote, which represents the second best result. Between the Jena connections and the NS students wide-ranging human and ideological connections were recorded.

When the Allied air raids to Jena in February and March struck in 1945, the University Library, the university main building and several clinics in the Bachstraße received total or significant physical damage. Completely destroyed were the Botanical Garden, the psychological and the physiological institute and three chemical Institutes. An important event for the National Socialist period was the investigation of the pediatrician Yusuf Ibrahim. A Senate Commission noted the participation of the physician to the "euthanasia" murders of physically or mentally disabled children.

Present

In the 20th century the university was promoted through cooperation with Carl Zeiss (company) and thereby enabling it to increase the student population as a mass university. In 1905 the university had 1,100 students and 112 university teachers, so this figure has since been almost twenty-fold. The Friedrich-Schiller University is the only comprehensive university in Thuringia.

Since 1995, there is a university association with the Martin Luther University of Halle-Wittenberg and the University of Leipzig. The aim is firstly to give the students the opportunity to visit with relatively few problems at the partner universities and events in order to broaden the range of subjects and topics. Currently e. g. has joined a cooperation in teaching in the field of bioinformatics. In addition, the cooperation provides the university management the opportunity to share experiences with their regular meetings and initiate common projects. So z. B. went from the successful bid to the German Centre for Integrative Biodiversity Research (iDiv) from the university network. The co-operation continues at other levels: for example in a joint mentoring program for female postdocs or in the central German archives network. And last but not least, there are common sports activities.

Since October 2014, the pharmacologist Walter Rosenthal is the president of the university; Chancellor is since 2007 the mathematician Klaus Bartholmé.

Organization

The university is organized in 10 schools:
 theology
 jurisprudence
 economics and business administration
 humanities
 social and behavioural sciences
 mathematics and computer science
 physics and astronomy
 chemical and earth sciences
 biology and pharmacy
 medicine

Research

Research at Friedrich Schiller University traditionally focusses on both humanities and sciences. In addition to the faculties the following "Collaborative Research Centers" (German "Sonderforschungsbereich", short: "SFB") operate at the university:

 CRC 1076 AquaDiva : Understanding the Links Between Surface and Subsurface Biogeosphere
 CRC/TR 124 FungiNet: Pathogenic fungi and their human host: Networks of interaction 
 CRC 1127 ChemBioSys: Chemical Mediators in Complex Biosystems 
 CRC/TR 166 ReceptorLight: High-end light microscopy elucidates membrane receptor function
 CRC 1278 Polymer-based nanoparticle libraries for targeted anti-inflammatory strategiesde 
 CRC / TR 234 CataLIGHT: Light-driven Molecular Catalysts in Hierarchically Structured Materials – Synthesis and Mechanistic Studiesde 
 CRC 1375 NOA: Nonlinear Optics down to Atomic Scales

Participations in DFG-Collaborative Research Centres:

 CRC 950 Manuskriptkulturen in Asien, Afrika und Europa 
 CRC/TRR 212 A Novel Synthesis of Individualisation across Behaviour, Ecology and Evolution: Niche Choice, Niche Conformance, Niche Construction

In 2006 the research center, Jena Center – History of the 20th century, was founded. In 2007 the graduate school "Jena School for Microbial Communication" (JSMC) was established within the German Universities Excellence Initiative. In 2008 the Center for Molecular Biomedicine (CMB) and the interdisciplinary research center Laboratory of the Enlightenment were developed as research institutions. 2014 the "Center of Advanced Research" (ZAF) was established.

Jena University is one of the founder of The German Centre for Integrative Biodiversity Research (iDiv) Halle-Jena-Leipzig, that was founded in 2013. It is a research centre of the German Research Foundation (DFG).

Friedrich Schiller University is the only German university with chairs for either gravitational theory or Caucasus Studies.

Notable faculty and alumni

 Manuk Abeghian Armenian philologist and linguist  
 Eva Ahnert-Rohlfs (doctorate in astronomy 1951)
 Wilibald Artus (1811–1880), Professor of Philosophy
 Johann Bachstrom, writer, scientist, physician and Lutheran theologian
 Ernst Gottfried Baldinger, German physician
 Hans Berger
 Otto Binswanger
 Albrecht von Blumenthal taught Classical Philology as Privatdozent 1922-8
Rudolf Brandt (1909–1948), Nazi SS officer, executed for war crimes
Werner Braune (1909–1951), Nazi SS officer, executed for war crimes
 Alfred Brehm
 Clemens Brentano
 Rudolf Carnap
 Heinrich Cotta, pioneer of scientific forestry
 Georg Friedrich Creuzer
 Claus Dierksmeier, German philosopher
 Carl H. Dorner
 Ernst Christoph Dressler (1734–1779), German composer, operatic tenor, violinist and music theorist
 Rudolf Christoph Eucken
 Johann Gottlieb Fichte
 Gottlob Frege
 Roland Freisler
 Michael Fritsch
 Johann Matthias Gesner
 Nelson Glueck
 Peter Griess
 Friedrich von Hagedorn
 Arvid Harnack
 Karl Hase
 Gerhart Hauptmann Nobel Prize–winning writer
 Georg Wilhelm Friedrich Hegel
 Cuno Hoffmeister
 Thede Kahl
 George Kessler
 Georg Klaus
 Christian Knaut, 17th Century botanist after whom Knautia arvensis was named by Linnaeus
 Karl Korsch (graduated from the University of Jena's law school summa cum laude superato, 1911)
 Jan Kollár, Panslavist and poet
 Li Linsi, Chinese educator and diplomat
 István Kováts
 Karl Christian Friedrich Krause
 Herbert Kroemer, Nobel Prize–winning physicist
 August Leskien
 Robert Ley
 Francis Lieber, emigrant to USA, author of "Lieber Code"
 Lucas Maius
 Karl Marx (doctorate in absentia, 1841)
 Ernest Nash
 Novalis
 Ernst Ottwalt
 Axel Oxenstierna
 Henri Pittier
 Samuel von Pufendorf
 Gerhard von Rad
 Werner Rolfinck
Erich Roth (1910–1947), Nazi Gestapo member executed for war crimes
 Solomon Marcus Schiller-Szinessy, doctorate (philosophy) (mathematics)
 Friedrich Wilhelm Joseph Schelling
 Friedrich Schiller
 August Wilhelm Schlegel
 August Schleicher, German Linguist, Tree model
 Arthur Schopenhauer (philosophy doctorate in absentia, 1813)
 Otto Schott, inventor of borosilicate glass
 Hugo Schuchardt, linguist
 David Spence (rubber chemistry), early pioneer in rubber chemistry
 Johann Gustav Stickel, orientalist
 Michael Stifel, monk and mathematician
 Cajetan Tschink, writer and philosopher
 Kurt Tucholsky, journalist and satirist
 Erhard Weigel, mathematician, astronomer, and philosopher
 Christa Wolf, novelist and essayist
 Christian Wolff, philosopher
 Carl Zeiss, optician

Museums and collections at the University
Among the collections which are open to the public are the Jena Phyletisches Museum, an institution which is unique in Europe for illustrating the history of evolution, the Ernst-Haeckel-Memorialmuseum, the Mineralogical Collection which traces its roots back to Goethe and the second oldest Botanical Garden of Middle Europe. The  (Schillers Gartenhaus) and the Goethe Memorial at the Botanical Garden are reminders of the two towering geniuses of Jena. Both buildings are also open to the public.

Oriental Collections / Papyrus Collection
 The Alphons-Stübel-Collection of Early Photographs from the Orient (1857–1890)
 Hilprecht Collection
 Orientalisches Münzkabinett (OMJ)
 Papyrus Collection
Archaeological Collections
 Collection of Ancient Art
 Collection of Plaster Casts of Ancient Sculpture
 The Photo- and Slide Collection of the Institute of Classical Archaeology
 The Collection of Prehistory and Early History
 The Bilzingsleben collection
 Departement of Art History and Custodia
Natural Sciences and Natural History
 The Ernst-Haeckel-Haus
 Zygomycetes (Mould Fungi)
 Didactics of Biology
 Herbarium Haussknecht (JE)
 Botanical garden
 Phyletic Museum
Mineralogy & Geology
 Mineralogical Collection
 Teaching Collection of Models for Mineralogy
History of Sciences
 Collection of scientific and technical devices for physics
 Astronomical collection
Medicine
 The Meyer Steineg Collection of Medical History in Jena
 Anatomical Collection
 Medical History  
 Goethe Memorial

See also
 List of early modern universities in Europe

Notes

References

Literature
 Mayhew, Henry (1864): German Life and Manners as Seen in Saxony at the Present Day: With an Account of Village Life – Town Life – Fashionable Life – Domestic Life – Married Life – School and University Life, &c., of Germany at the Present Time: Illustrated with Songs and Pictures of the Student Customs at the University of Jena. In Two Volumes. London [Vol. II, Section VII, Chapter VI-XI: Student Life at Jena].

External links
University of Jena 
University of Jena, statistics  
Norbert Nail: Der schottische Dichter Charles Hamilton Sorley als Student im Sommer 1914 an Saale, Lahn und Mosel  (in German)
Norbert Nail: John Baillie – Schotte, Pastor, Student 1909/11 in Jena und Marburg. In: Studenten-Kurier 3/2017, pp. 16–18.  (in German)
Norbert Nail: Ein tödliches Pistolenduell 1848 auf der Trießnitz in (Jena-)Winzerla. In: Studenten-Kurier 1-2/2019, pp. 12–17  (in German – a deadly student duel at Jena)

 
Jena
Jena
1558 establishments in the Holy Roman Empire
Jena
Public universities
Friedrich Schiller
Buildings and structures in Jena